Dmytro Ivanusa (born 25 August 1972) is a Ukrainian swimmer. He competed in the men's 200 metre breaststroke event at the 1996 Summer Olympics.

References

External links
 

1972 births
Living people
Ukrainian male breaststroke swimmers
Olympic swimmers of Ukraine
Swimmers at the 1996 Summer Olympics
Place of birth missing (living people)
20th-century Ukrainian people